Marotrao Shambshio Kannamwar was an Indian politician who served as Chief Minister of Maharashtra from 20 November 1962 to 24 November 1963.

He represented Saoli Vidhan Sabha constituency in Bombay State in 1957 and of the Maharashtra State from 1960 to 1962.
 He was re-elected from Saoli in 1962 elections to the Maharashtra Vidhan Sabha. He died while in office on 24 November 1963.

Legacy
 Kannamwar Nagar in Vikhroli ( East), Mumbai was named after him. 
 KDK College of Engineering, Nagpur is named in his honour.
 Congress-Bhavan in Chandrapur renamed after Ex- CM of Maharashtra.
 Also, on NH-6 beyond Kondhali (50+ km from Nagpur) a detour from the NH 6, a village Kannamwargram is named after the great leader. 
Government Granted school in Village Surbodi, Chandrapur district is named after him (Karmavir Kannamwar Vidhyalaya Surbodi High School) which was founded by Shriram Dhote in the year 1982.

Source: https://www.icbse.com
It is on the road towards Bangdapur.Bangdapur is on the Kondhali-Wardha connecting road.

Notes

Chief Ministers of Maharashtra
Maharashtra MLAs 1960–1962
Maharashtra MLAs 1962–1967
Marathi politicians
1963 deaths
People from Chandrapur district
Chief ministers from Indian National Congress
1900 births
Indian National Congress politicians from Maharashtra